Persepolis Football Club is an Iranian professional association football club based in Tehran. The club was formed in 1963, and played its first competitive match against Rah Ahan F.C. Persepolis currently plays in the Persian Gulf Pro League. Persepolis is the only club, never to have been relegated from the league. They have also been involved in Asian football, winning the Asian Cup Winners' Cup.

This list encompasses the major honours won by Persepolis and records set by the club, their managers and their players. The player records section includes details of the club's leading goalscorers and those who have made most appearances in first-team competitions. It also records the highest transfer fees paid and received by the club.

This page details Persepolis Football Club records.

Statistics

Statistics in IPL                                                                                                                                                                           

Seasons in IPL: 20 (all)
Best position in IPL: First (2001-02), (2007-08), (2016-17), (2017-18), (2018-19), (2019-20), (2020-21)
Worst position in IPL: 12 (2011-12) 
Most goals scored in a season: 56 (Azadegan League 1998-99),55 (IPL 2007-08)
Most goals scored in a match: 8 against Pegah F.C. (IPL 2003-04)
Most goals conceded in a match: 4 against Esteghlal Ahvaz F.C. (IPL 2007-08), TractorSazi (2011-12)

Statistics in AFC Champions League

Most goals scored in a match: 6 against Al-Shabab (UAE)
Most goals conceded in a match: 5 against Al-Gharafa (2009) (21 April 2009)

Player records

Appearances

 Most Appearances:341 Ali Parvin
 Most League Appearances: Afshin Peyrovani (209)
 Most Goalkeeper Appearances: Vahid Ghelich (185)
 Youngest first-team player : Mehdi Mahdavikia (17 years and 206 days old)
 Youngest first-team player in a league match : Mehdi Mahdavikia (17 years and 206 days old)
 Oldest first-team player : Ali Parvin (41 years and ? days old)
Player who has won most league titles: Afshin Peyrovani, Behrouz Rahbarifard, Esmaeil Halali, Jalal Hosseini, Kamal Kamyabinia and Božidar Radošević (5 Titles)

Goalscorers
 All-time top scorer: Farshad Pious with 153 goals
 First Goalscorer : Nazem Ganjapour
 First Goalscorer in Tehran derby: Nazem Ganjapour
 Most Goalscorer in Tehran derby: 7 (Safar Iranpak)
 Most goals in a season : 26 (Ali Alipour', 2017–18)
 Most League goals in a season : 20 (Farshad Pious, 1994–95)
 Most goals in a single match at home : 4 goals (Ali Daei, 2003–04)
 Most goals in an AFC Champions League match : 3 Emon Zayed (Al-Shabab), Mehdi Taremi (Al Wahda )
 Fastest recorded goal : 00:07 Gholamreza Rezaei vs Fajr Sepasi (2012-13 Pro League)
 Latest recorded goal : 90+10:24 Vahid Amiri vs Machine Sazi (2019-20 Hazfi Cup)
 Youngest goalscorer : Mehdi Mahdavikia against Polyacryl Esfahan F.C. (17 years and 300 days old)

 Players statistics 

Most appearances

 Top goalscorers 

Most goals scored in official competitions: 153– Farshad Pious 1985–1988 & 1989–1997.

Most appearances Foreigners

 Top Foreigners goalscorers 

 Persepolis top flight top goalscorer 
This is the list of Persepolis top league goalscorers in a single season.

 Transfers 

Record transfer feesRecord transfer fee received:
The club's record sale came in July 2001, when they sold Ali Karimi to Al-Ahli Dubai for a fee of €2.5 million.

€ 2.500.000 from  Al-Ahli Dubai for  Ali Karimi, July 2001
€ 2.250.000 from  Hamburger SV for  Mehdi Mahdavikia 2001
€ 1.250.000 from  Hamburger SV for  Mehdi Mahdavikia, 1999
€ 1.150.000 from  SK Sturm Graz for  Mehrdad Minavand, 1998
€ 950.000† from  Rubin Kazan for  Alireza Haghighi, January 2012
€ 550.000‡ from  Charlton Athletic for  Karim Bagheri, 2000
€ 500.000 from  Al-Shaab for  Mehrzad Madanchi, 2006
† about $ 1.400.000
‡ about £ 400,000

 World Cup players 
The following World Cup players, played at Persepolis at some point during their career. Highlighted players played for Persepolis while playing at the World Cup.

  Javad Allahverdi (Argentina 1978)
  Ali Parvin (Argentina 1978)
  Mohammad Sadeghi (Argentina 1978)
  Bahram Mavaddat (Argentina 1978)
  Nasser Nouraei (Argentina 1978)
  Hossein Faraki (Argentina 1978)
  Ahmad Reza Abedzadeh (France 1998)
  Mehdi Mahdavikia (France 1998)
  Naeim Saadavi (France 1998)
  Mohammad Khakpour (France 1998)
  Afshin Peyrovani (France 1998)
  Karim Bagheri (France 1998)
  Hamid Estili (France 1998)
  Ali Daei (France 1998)
  Khodadad Azizi (France 1998)
  Nima Nakisa (France 1998)
  Nader Mohammadkhani (France 1998)
  Reza Shahroudi (France 1998)
  Behnam Seraj (France 1998)
  Mehrdad Minavand (France 1998)
  Mehdi Mahdavikia (Germany 2006)
  Yahya Golmohammadi (Germany 2006)
  Rahman Rezaei (Germany 2006)

  Ali Karimi (Germany 2006)
  Ali Daei (Germany 2006)
  Vahid Hashemian (Germany 2006)
  Hassan Roudbarian (Germany 2006)
  Hossein Kaebi (Germany 2006)
  Javad Kazemian (Germany 2006)
  Mehrzad Madanchi (Germany 2006)
  Mohammad Nosrati (Germany 2006)
  Franck Atsou (Germany 2006)
  Michael Umaña (Brazil 2014)
  Rahman Ahmadi (Brazil 2014)
  Jalal Hosseini (Brazil 2014)
  Reza Haghighi (Brazil 2014)
  Karim Ansarifard (Brazil 2014)
  Alireza Haghighi (Brazil 2014)
  Hossein Mahini (Brazil 2014)
  Mehrdad Pooladi (Brazil 2014)
  Alireza Beiranvand (Russia 2018) (Qatar 2022)
  Vahid Amiri' (Russia 2018) (Qatar 2022)
 Mehdi Taremi (Russia 2018)
 Ramin Rezaeian (Russia 2018)
 Mohammad Reza Khanzadeh (Russia 2018)
 Morteza Pouraliganji (Qatar 2022)
 Mehdi Torabi (Qatar 2022)

References

External links
 Club records

Statistics
Iranian football club statistics